Bingham Loop is a station and turning loop at the eastern terminus of the 503 Kingston Rd streetcar lines of the Toronto Transit Commission (TTC). It lies between Victoria Park Avenue and Bingham Avenue, just north of Kingston Road in Toronto. 

Streetcars loop anticlockwise from Victoria Park Avenue and stop on the south side of the platform, while buses enter in the other direction from Bingham Avenue and stop on the north side. A small brick building provides facilities for TTC staff.

History
The private Toronto and Scarboro' Electric Railway, Light and Power Company had operated the single track Scarboro radial line along Kingston Road to West Hill. When the TTC assumed the route between Queen Street and Victoria Park in 1922, they double tracked the line and built the return loop at Bingham. In 1927, the TTC took over operation of the Scarboro radial line, which terminated on the east side of Victoria Park Avenue, and connected it to the Bingham Loop so that radial cars could be stored at Russell Carhouse. In 1928, the TTC extended the double track east to Birchmount Loop replacing the Scarboro radial line to that point. The Bingham Loop was rebuilt in 1954, with one track removed to accommodate buses as it is today, and streetcar service east of Victoria Park was discontinued.

The tracks at the loop and along Kingston Road were replaced in 2013. The remnants of the old trackage were removed, including a feature which allowed streetcars exiting from Bingham Avenue to turn east on  Kingston Road and reenter the loop.

Services
 12 Kingston Rd - westbound to Victoria Park station (stops eastbound on Kingston Road) 
 22A Coxwell - terminus to Coxwell station
 302 Kingston Rd - McCowan - terminus to Steeles Avenue and McCowan Road via Kingston Road
 322 Coxwell - terminus via Coxwell station and Cosburn to Broadview station
 324 Victoria Park - terminus to Steeles Avenue and Warden Avenue
 503 Kingston Rd - terminus to Spadina Avenue and King Street

See also
 Victoria Park terminal, Scarboro radial

References

External links
 Bingham Loop, 1927-1928, and Scarboro radial terminal

Toronto streetcar loops
Railway stations opened in 1922